Lataitai is a village on the island of Savai'i in Samoa. It is situated on the south coast of the island in Palauli district.

References

Populated places in Samoa